Cornelia Oschkenat, (née Riefstahl; born 29 October 1961) is a German former track and field athlete who represented East Germany. She competed at the 1988 Olympic Games in Seoul.  At the 1987 World Championships in Rome, she won a bronze medal in the 100 metres hurdles with a time of 12.46s as well as silver medal as a member of the East German 4 × 100 metres relay team.

She also won the 1987 World Indoor 60 m hurdles title, two World Cup 100 m hurdles titles and three European Indoor 60 m hurdles titles. Her world indoor record for the 50 metres hurdles of 6.58 secs in 1988, still stands (as of 2019).

Oschkenat won eleven East German individual national titles, taking five titles in the 100 m hurdles between 1984 and 1989 at the East German Athletics Championships, as well as six consecutive titles in the 60 m hurdles at the East German Indoor Athletics Championships over that period.

Career
Oschkenat was born Cornelia Riefstahl in Neubrandenburg, Mecklenburg-Vorpommern, East Germany. She began her international career in 1982 and reached the World Championship final in 1983. She was unable to participate in the 1984 Olympic Games in Los Angeles because of her country's boycott of the games. In 1985, she won the World Cup title in Canberra. In 1986 she won a silver medal behind Yordanka Donkova at the European Championships in Stuttgart. She won perhaps her biggest individual title in 1987, at the World Indoor Championships in Indianapolis, when she won the 60 m hurdles, finishing ahead of her two chief career rivals, the Bulgarian pair of Donkova and Ginka Zagorcheva. Later that year at the World Championships in Rome, she won bronze in the 100 m hurdles behind Zagorcheva and East German teammate Gloria Siebert, but ahead of Donkova, who was fourth.

A medal favourite for the 1988 Seoul Olympics, she pulled a muscle midway through the final and limped over the line in eight place. After finishing third at the 1989 World Indoor Championships, she went on to have one of her best ever outdoor seasons. Her victories included both the European and World cup events. She ended the outdoor season unbeaten. Having been ranked second in the Track and Field News world merit rankings for three consecutive years, 1985–87, she was the clear number one in 1989. In 1990, she finished fourth at the European Championships in Split in what would be her eighth consecutive (and final) year ranked in the world top ten (on time and merit). She represented a united Germany at the 1991 World Championships in Tokyo but was eliminated in the heats and retired at the end of that season.

Oschkenat represented the Dynamo Berlin sport club. During her career she was 1.76 meters tall and weighed 65 kilograms. She married fellow hurdler, Andreas Oschkenat in 1984.

International competitions

(h) Indicates overall position in qualifying heats.

National titles
East German Athletics Championships
100 m hurdles: 1984, 1985, 1986, 1988, 1989
East German Indoor Athletics Championships
60 m hurdles: 1984, 1985, 1986, 1987, 1988, 1989

References

External links

1961 births
Living people
People from Neubrandenburg
People from Bezirk Neubrandenburg
East German female hurdlers
East German female sprinters
German female sprinters
German female hurdlers
Sportspeople from Mecklenburg-Western Pomerania
Olympic athletes of East Germany
Athletes (track and field) at the 1988 Summer Olympics
World Athletics Championships athletes for East Germany
World Athletics Championships athletes for Germany
World Athletics Championships medalists
European Athletics Championships medalists
Goodwill Games medalists in athletics
World Athletics indoor record holders
Recipients of the Patriotic Order of Merit in silver
World Athletics Indoor Championships winners
World Athletics Indoor Championships medalists
Competitors at the 1986 Goodwill Games